The 2004 Arizona Democratic presidential primary took place on February 3, 2004, as part of the 2004 United States Democratic presidential primaries. The delegate allocation is Proportional. the candidates are awarded delegates in proportion to the percentage of votes received and is open to registered Democrats only. A total of 55 (of 64) delegates are awarded proportionally. A 15 percent threshold is required to receive delegates. Frontrunner John Kerry won the primary with former general Wesley Clark coming second.

In 2003 the Arizona primary had been moved up from February 24 on tuesday February 3, 2004 by Democratic Governor Janet Napolitano in order to give the state more influence in the nomination contest.

Campaign
The candidates began campaigning in Arizona in September 2003 and by the time of the primary had spent 2.5 million dollars on television adverts in the state. Arizona was the first primary in the Western United States and as such was regarded as the first chance to see how the candidates appealed among Hispanic voters.

Howard Dean was the early favourite for the primary but by the time of the primary he had lost ground to both Wesley Clark and John Kerry. Kerry surged strongly in the polls after he had established himself as the strong frontrunner for the nomination in Iowa and New Hampshire. Exit polls showed Kerry did well among the half of voters who made up their minds in the last week before the primary.

Endorsements
Wesley Clark got the endorsement of former Mayor of Phoenix, Arizona Paul Johnson while Kerry got the endorsements of several state officials. Howard Dean received the endorsement of former Governor Bruce Babbitt. However Governor Janet Napolitano avoided endorsing any of the candidates and only endorsed John Kerry after the primary was finished on March 1.

Joe Lieberman made the most visits of any of the candidates to Arizona and this helped him to get the endorsement of Phoenix newspaper, The Arizona Republic.

Polling

Source: Arizona - 2004 Presidential Polls

Statewide results

Reaction 
John Kerry welcomed the results saying "I am stunned by the results and truly honored and humbled by the confidence that so many voters in Arizona have shown me today".

Analysis 
On Mini Tuesday, John F. Kerry won the Arizona Primary election with about 43% of the vote. He also won every congressional district and county, except Greenlee County which voted for Clark. The largest turnouts in the state came from Maricopa County and Pima County. Exit polls showed he did well among older voters, Hispanics and veterans. He defeated his rivals among liberals, moderates and conservatives.

See also
Democratic Party (United States) presidential primaries, 2004

References

Arizona
2004 Arizona elections
2004